The Gong Show Movie is a 1980 American slapstick film starring, co-written and directed by Chuck Barris, the host and creator of the popular game show with the same name.

Plot
The film shows a fictional week in the life of Chuck Barris as the host and creator of The Gong Show, through a series of outrageous competitors, stressful situations, a nervous breakdown (which compels him to run away and hide in the Moroccan desert) and other comic hijinks in his life and work on the TV show. Among the highlights included a group of men dressed as a Roman Catholic priest and three nuns lip-synching Tom Lehrer's song "The Vatican Rag", a man blowing out a candle with flatulence, and the uncensored version of Jaye P. Morgan's infamous breast-baring incident.

Reception
The film premiered in May 1980 alongside The Empire Strikes Back and The Shining, beating the latter at the box office in its opening weekend but losing to the former. The film received uniformly negative reviews and was withdrawn from theaters shortly after its release.

Among the many bad reviews at the time was one from George Burns, who, after seeing the movie, went on the record and said, "For the first time in 65 years, I wanted to get out of show business."

Home media
The movie was occasionally seen on a few cable movie channels during the 1980s but had never been available on home video in any format until a Blu-ray release from Shout! Factory on March 29, 2016.

References

External links
 
 
 

1980 films
1980 comedy films
American comedy films
Films about television
Films about quizzes and game shows
Films based on television series
Films with screenplays by Robert Downey Sr.
Universal Pictures films
1980 directorial debut films
1980s English-language films
1980s American films